Estrie is an administrative region of Quebec that comprises the Eastern Townships. Estrie, a French neologism, was coined as a derivative of est, "east". Originally settled by anglophones, today it is about 90 per cent francophone. Anglophones are concentrated in Lennoxville, home of the region's only English-speaking university, Bishop's University. The Eastern Townships School Board runs 20 elementary schools, three high schools, and a learning centre.

The region originally consisted of 6 RCM's. In 2021, La Haute-Yamaska & Brome-Missisquoi joined Estrie, transferring from Montérégie.

Economy

While the economy of the area is mainly based on agriculture, forestry, and mining, tourist attractions include four Sépaq parks: Yamaska, Mont-Orford, Frontenac, and Mont-Mégantic, ski resorts at Mont Brome and Mont Orford, and agritourism.

Administrative divisions

Regional county municipalities

Equivalent territory

Demographics
<noinclude>

School Districts

Francophone:
 Commission scolaire des Hauts-Cantons (Coaticook, East Angus and Lac-Mégantic).
 Commission scolaire de la Région-de-Sherbrooke
 Commission scolaire des Sommets

Anglophone:
 Eastern Townships School Board

Major communities
Bromont
Coaticook
Cookshire-Eaton
Cowansville
Farnham
Granby
Lac-BromeLac-Mégantic
Magog
Orford
Shefford
Sherbrooke
Val-des-Sources
Windsor

References

Further reading

External links
 Estrie, Government of Quebec
 Tourism Eastern Townships
 Estrieplus.com 

 
Administrative regions of Quebec